Paolo Grossi (born 29 May 1981 in Milan) is an Italian professional football player who last played for U.S. Arezzo.

Biography
Grossi was signed by AlbinoLeffe in co-ownership deal in 2009, for €180,000. In June 2011 Varese bought back Grossi for €455,000.

Grossi was signed by Siena outright for €1.1 million on 6 July 2011 in 3-year deal. He chose no.17 shirt. On 4 July 2012 he moved to Serie B newcomer Hellas Verona F.C. in temporary deal for €30,000 with option to purchase for €275,000. On 29 January 2013 50% "card" of Grossi was swapped with 50% "card" of Marco Guzzo, who also valued €275,000. 30 January 2013 Grossi was signed by fellow Serie B club Pro Vercelli. At the end of season Verona promoted from Serie B; Pro Vercelli relegated from Serie B and Siena relegated to Serie B. In June 2013 the co-ownership deals were renewed. On 2 September 2013 Grossi was signed by Serie B club Brescia Calcio in another temporary deal. On 20 August 2014 he was loaned out to Virtus Lanciano. On 24 August 2015 he signed on a free transfer to Ternana Calcio. On 19 July 2016 he signed with Serie C side U.S. Arezzo on a free transfer.

References

1981 births
Living people
Italian footballers
Serie B players
Serie A players
S.S.D. Varese Calcio players
U.C. AlbinoLeffe players
A.C.N. Siena 1904 players
F.C. Pro Vercelli 1892 players
Hellas Verona F.C. players
Brescia Calcio players
S.S. Virtus Lanciano 1924 players
Ternana Calcio players
Footballers from Milan
Association football midfielders